Cratystylis is a genus of Australian flowering plants in the family Asteraceae.

 Species
 Cratystylis centralis Albr. & Paul G.Wilson - Western Australia, Northern Territory
 Cratystylis conocephala (F.Muell.) S.Moore - Western Australia, South Australia, Victoria, New South Wales
 Cratystylis microphylla S.Moore - Western Australia
 Cratystylis subspinescens S.Moore - Western Australia

References

Asteraceae genera
Inuleae
Endemic flora of Australia
Taxa named by Spencer Le Marchant Moore